Hedgepeth is a last name shared by the following people:
Faith Hedgepeth (1992–2012), American college student killed in her apartment
Marion Hedgepeth (1856–1909), American Wild West outlaw
Whitney Hedgepeth (b. 1971), American Olympic swimmer

See also
Hedgepeth and Williams v. Board of Education